Won Ton Ton, the Dog Who Saved Hollywood is a 1976 American comedy film directed by Michael Winner, and starring Bruce Dern, Madeline Kahn, Teri Garr and Art Carney. Spoofing the craze surrounding Rin Tin Tin, the film is notable for the large number of cameo appearances by actors and actresses from Hollywood's golden age many of whom had been employees of Paramount Pictures, the film's distributor.

Plot
After escaping the dog pound, a German Shepherd links up with a budding actress and a wannabe film screenwriter, and becomes a Hollywood star.

Cast
Starring

Bruce Dern as Grayson Potchuck
Madeline Kahn as Estie Del Ruth
Art Carney as J.J. Fromberg
Phil Silvers as Murray Fromberg
Ron Leibman as Rudy Montague
Teri Garr as Fluffy Peters
Ronny Graham as Mark Bennett
Toni Basil as Guest at Awards Ceremony

Larger cameos

Dorothy Lamour as Visiting Film Star
Joan Blondell as Landlady
Virginia Mayo as Miss Battley
Henny Youngman as Manny Farber
Rory Calhoun as Phillip Hart
Aldo Ray as Stubby Stebbins
Ethel Merman as Hedda Parsons
Nancy Walker as Mrs. Fromberg
Rhonda Fleming as Rhoda Flaming
Dean Stockwell as Paul Lavell
Dick Haymes as James Crawford
Tab Hunter as David Hamilton
Robert Alda as Richard Entwhistle
Victor Mature as Nick
Edgar Bergen as Professor Quicksand
Henry Wilcoxon as Silent Film Director
Alice Faye as Secretary at Gate
Yvonne De Carlo as Cleaning Woman

Brief cameo appearances

Dennis Morgan as Tour Guide
Shecky Greene as Tourist
William Demarest as Studio Gatekeeper
Billy Barty as Assistant Director
Ricardo Montalbán as Silent Film Star (credited as Ricardo Montalban)
Jackie Coogan as Stagehand #1
Andy Devine as Priest in Dog Pound
Broderick Crawford as Special Effects Man
Richard Arlen as Silent Film Star #2
Jack La Rue as Silent Film Villain
Gloria DeHaven as President's Girl #1
Louis Nye as Radio Interviewer
Johnny Weissmuller as Stagehand #2 (final film role)
Stepin Fetchit as Dancing Butler
Ken Murray as Souvenir Salesman
Rudy Vallee as Autograph Hound
George Jessel as Awards Announcer
Ann Miller as President's Girl #2
Eli Mintz as Tailor
Fritz Feld as Rudy's Butler
Edward Ashley as Second Butler
Jane Connell as Waitress
Janet Blair as President's Girl #3
Dennis Day as Singing Telegraph Man
Mike Mazurki as Studio Guard
Harry Ritz and Jimmy Ritz as Cleaning Women
Jesse White as Rudy's Agent
Carmel Myers as Woman Journalist
Jack Carter as Male Journalist
Barbara Nichols as Nick's Girl
Army Archerd as Premiere MC
Fernando Lamas as Premiere Male Star
Zsa Zsa Gabor as Premiere Female Star
Cyd Charisse as President's Girl #4
Huntz Hall as Moving Man
Doodles Weaver as Man in Mexican Film
Pedro Gonzalez Gonzalez as Mexican Projectionist
Morey Amsterdam as Custard Pie Star #1
Eddie Foy Jr. as Custard Pie Star #2
Peter Lawford as Custard Pie Star #3
Patricia Morison as Star at Screening
Guy Madison as Star at Screening
Regis Toomey as Burlesque Stagehand
Ann Rutherford as Grayson's Studio Secretary
Milton Berle as Blind Man
John Carradine as Drunk
Keye Luke as Cook in Kitchen
Walter Pidgeon as Grayson's Butler
Phil Leeds as Dog Catcher #1
Cliff Norton as Dog Catcher #2
Sterling Holloway as Old Man on Bus
William Benedict as Man on Bus
Dorothy Gulliver as Old Woman on Bus
Eddie LeVeque as Prostitute's Customer

Production
The film was originally called A Bark is Born and was based on the career of Rin Tin Tin. The story was written by Cy Howard in 1971. He hired Arnold Schulmann to write the script. It was developed by David Picker at Warner Bros who requested the title be changed so as to not clash with their upcoming version of A Star is Born. Picker changed it to Won Ton Ton the Dog that Saved Warner Bros.

Warner Bros decided not to make the film. Picker took the script with him when he moved to Paramount, causing the title to be changed. The owners of Rin Tin Tin sued the producers, causing Picker to insist his dog was completely fictional.

Lily Tomlin was offered the female lead but wanted her partner Jane Wagner to rewrite the script. Director Michael Winner said Tomlin "felt we mustn't go for the laugh. Well, in a comedy laughs don't hurt." Tomlin left the project. Picker says Bette Midler wanted to make the film "but we couldn't come to an arrangement." Eventually Madeline Kahn was cast.

Dern said he accepted the lead "because I've never been in a hit. This is a very funny movie."

Filming started in August 1975. Karl Miller was in charge of the dog.

Arnold Schulman, credited as a writer and producer, later said:
Not only did David Picker, the producer, have every word of the script rewritten, but he hired Michael Winner, the director of all the Charles Bronson Death Wish pictures, to "realize" the film, as the post-Cahiers du Cinéma directors like to put it. It was written by me as a satire, written by God-knows-who as a slapstick farce, and directed with all the charm and wit of a chain-saw massacre. I had nothing to do with the final picture, and on that one, I was not only listed as cowriter but also as executive producer, and I couldn't get my name off! (Laughs.)

Reception
The film, which has a score of 14% on Rotten Tomatoes from 14 critics, opened to negative reviews when it opened in the late spring of 1976.

Richard Eder of The New York Times declared, "What saves the movie, a jumble of good jokes and bad, sloppiness, chaos and apparently any old thing that came to hand, is Madeline Kahn ... What she has as W. C. Fields and Buster Keaton and Charlie Chaplin had is a kind of unwavering purpose at right angles to reality, a concentration that she bears, Magoolike, through all kinds of unreasonable events." Arthur D. Murphy of Variety reported that "this project might have worked to a degree of whimsy. But the alchemy in the direction has turned potential cotton candy into reinforced concrete; Winner's 'Death Wish' is funnier in comparison." Kevin Thomas of the Los Angeles Times wrote, "Sixty guest stars can't save 'Won Ton Ton, the Dog Who Saved Hollywood' ... from its unrelentingly crass tone and steady stream of unfunny jokes. Unquestionably, the best performance is given by an appealing German shepherd named Augustus Von Schumacher, who plays Won Ton Ton." Gene Siskel of the Chicago Tribune gave the film two stars out of four and called it "a scattershot comedy that can't make up its mind whether to be 'wholesome family entertainment' or a smutty film industry in-joke. It goes both ways."

John Pym of The Monthly Film Bulletin wrote, "Michael Winner does not have Mel Brooks' frenzied gift for marshaling this sort of material; and, to make matters worse, the script attains a level of parody no higher than Ron Leibman's mincing caricature of Valentino, embellished with little more than the standard mannerisms of the familiar theatrical queen." Gary Arnold of The Washington Post stated, "This tacky exercise in mock nostalgia may be added to that recent, weirdly miscalculated genre that includes 'W. C. Fields and Me', 'Gable and Lombard' and 'The Day of the Locust' ... They may be presented as uninhibited, madcap spoofs of Old Hollywood, but they tend to end up illustrating the New Hollywood at its most crass, insecure and condescending."

The film was one of five reviewed in the July 16, 1976, edition of The Times of London, where David Robinson had some particularly biting criticisms of it:

References

External links
 
 
 

1976 films
1976 comedy films
American comedy films
1970s English-language films
Films about actors
Films about dogs
Films about Hollywood, Los Angeles
Films directed by Michael Winner
Films scored by Neal Hefti
Films set in 1924
Films shot in Los Angeles
Paramount Pictures films
Rin Tin Tin
German shepherds
Films produced by Michael Winner
1970s American films